Turritella cingulifera is a species of sea snail, a marine gastropod mollusk in the family Turritellidae.

It is placed either in subgenus Kurosioia or Haustator.

Distribution
This marine species is found in the sublittoral zone of Australian waters, the Indo-Pacific Region and the East China Sea.

Description
The slender conical shell is whitish to yellowish brown with a chestnut band next to the suture. The shell sometimes has undulating, transverse chestnut lines or a central chestnut band made up of two or three close parallel lines on the body whorl.
The shell has about twelve whorls. They are contracted between the deep suture and then rounded with a number of thin, elevated, spiral striae. The length of the shell is 1,90 cm (.75-inch).

References

 Sowerby, G. B., I. 1825. A catalogue of the shells contained in the collection of the late Earl of Tankerville, arranged according to the Lamarckian conchological system; together with an appendix, containing descriptions of many new species. London: E. J, available online at https://books.google.com/books?id=TXqqeuJUQygC page(s): p. 56 + Appendix p. 14
 Gould, A.A. (1861) Description of new shells collected by the United States North Pacific Exploring Expedition. Proceedings of the Boston Society of Natural History 7: 382–389; 400–409. page(s): 386
 Garrard, T. A. (1972) A revision of Australian Recent and Tertiary Turritellidae (Gastropoda, Mollusca), J. Malac. Soc. Aust., 2(3): 267-338

External links
 

Turritellidae
Gastropods described in 1825
Taxa named by George Brettingham Sowerby I